Isola (ISOLA 多重人格少女 ISOLA Taju-jinkaku Shojo) is a 2000 Japanese horror film directed by Toshiyuki Mizutani. The film is about a woman with ESP who helps the survivors of the Great Hanshin earthquake, who then encounters a girl with a personality disorder, one which is malevolent and possesses paranormal powers.

Cast
Cast adapted from the Toho Filmography book:

Release
Isola was distributed theatrically in Japan by Toho on January 22, 2000. It was released as a double feature with Ring 0: Birthday. The film was released direct-to-video by Adness America Co. with English subtitles on February 15, 2005.

Reception
From contemporary reviews, reviewers in Fangoria described the film as "straightforward fright fare" with "a few good thrills" noting that the character's relationships were "nicely handled" but that the "story falls apart in the second half".

References

Sources

External links
 

Japanese horror films
2000 horror films
2000s Japanese films